Yellow Bluff Fort Historic State Park is a Florida State Park in Jacksonville, Florida. It is located near the mouth of the St. Johns River, a mile south of State Road 105 on New Berlin Road, in the cities Northside area. On September 29, 1970, it was added to the U.S. National Register of Historic Places.

History

Yellow Bluff 'Fort' was not a fort at all, but instead an armed and fortified camp constructed during the Civil War. It served to protect shipping supply lines to Jacksonville and through the St. Johns valley from Union attacks. The camp was built in early 1862, holding over 350 personnel at some points of its existence, which lasted until the end of the war.

Recreational activities
Visitors can picnic in an authentic reproduction of a Confederate and Union troop encampment.

Special events
Every year, the park has a day of illustrated presentations and living history demonstrations showing the historical and cultural significance of the area.

Admission and hours
There are no entrance fees. The park is open 24 hours a day.

References

External links

 Yellow Bluff Fort Historic State Park at Florida State Parks
 Yellow Bluff Fort Historic State Park at State Parks
 Duval County listings at National Register of Historic Places
 Duval County listings at Florida's Office of Cultural and Historical Programs
 Yellow Bluff Fort Historic State Park - plans at Florida Department of Environmental Protection

Yellow Bluff
State parks of Florida
National Register of Historic Places in Jacksonville, Florida
Parks in Jacksonville, Florida
Protected areas established in 1970
Yellow
Northside, Jacksonville
1970 establishments in Florida
American Civil War on the National Register of Historic Places